Nicolás Sessa (born 23 March 1996) is a German professional footballer who plays as a midfielder for  club SC Verl.

Career
In August 2022, after 1. FC Kaiserslautern's promotion to the 2. Bundesliga, Sessa left the club to join 3. Liga side SC Verl.

Personal life
Sessa is of Argentine descent through his father. His younger brother Kevin is also a footballer.

References

External links
 
 
 

1996 births
Living people
Footballers from Stuttgart
German footballers
Germany youth international footballers
Argentine footballers
German people of Argentine descent
Sportspeople of Argentine descent
Association football midfielders
TSG 1899 Hoffenheim II players
VfB Stuttgart II players
VfB Stuttgart players
VfR Aalen players
FC Erzgebirge Aue players
1. FC Kaiserslautern players
1. FC Kaiserslautern II players
SC Verl players
3. Liga players
Regionalliga players